Carl Westcott (born 1939, Vicksburg, Mississippi) is an American entrepreneur and the founder of several companies including 1-800-Flowers, First Extended Service Corporation, and Westcott Communications.

He lives in Dallas. He has four children: Gary Keith, Carla, Court Hilton and Chart Hampden.  

Court is married to Kameron Westcott, who appeared on seasons 3-5 of the Real Housewives of Dallas on the Bravo network.

Businesses

After leaving the army, Westcott moved to California and got a job in car sales.  In 1967 he bought a car dealership and by 1979 Westcott owned 17 dealerships across the nation. Westcott Communications was sold in 1996 for $422 million to K-III Communications which was nominally owned by leveraged buyout firm Kohlberg Kravis Roberts.  Most recently he served as Chairman of Westcott LLC and General Partner of Commodore Partners, Ltd., a real estate development and holding company.

Awards

Westcott has received several awards including the Arthur M. Young Society, Entrepreneur of the Year Award in 1988 and the Horatio Alger Award from the Horatio Alger Association of Distinguished Americans in 2003.

References

1939 births
Living people
People from Vicksburg, Mississippi
American company founders